Serixia sericeipennis is a species of beetle in the family Cerambycidae. It was described by Stephan von Breuning in 1963.

References

Serixia
Beetles described in 1963